Robert Gufflet was a French sailor who competed at the 1900 Summer Olympics. Gufflet took the gold in the first race of the 3 to 10 ton and the silver medal in the second race of that class. He also competed in the 1928 Summer Olympics.

References

External links

 

1883 births
1933 deaths
French male sailors (sport)
Sailors at the 1900 Summer Olympics – 3 to 10 ton
Olympic sailors of France
Olympic silver medalists for France
Olympic bronze medalists for France
Olympic medalists in sailing
Sportspeople from Bordeaux
Medalists at the 1900 Summer Olympics
Sailors at the 1900 Summer Olympics – Open class
Sailors at the 1928 Summer Olympics – 6 Metre